Henry Floyd (2 April 1793 – 4 March 1868) was an English first-class cricketer who is recorded in one match in 1817, totalling 1 run with a highest score of 1.

References

Bibliography
 

English cricketers
English cricketers of 1787 to 1825
E. H. Budd's XI cricketers
1793 births
1868 deaths